Zapato Point is a point 3 miles (4.8 km) southwest of Canon Point on the west coast of Graham Land. First seen by the Belgian Antarctic Expedition under Gerlache, which sailed between the point and Brooklyn Island, on February 7, 1898. The name appears on an Argentine government chart of 1954.

Headlands of Graham Land
Danco Coast